Holbrookia is a genus of earless lizards, known commonly as the lesser earless lizards, in the family Phrynosomatidae. The genus contains six recognized species, which are found throughout the Southwestern and Central United States and northern Mexico. They are characterized by having no external ear openings, presumably to prevent soil from entering their bodies when they are digging.

Etymology
The generic name, Holbrookia, is in honor of American zoologist John Edwards Holbrook.

Description
Lesser earless lizards grow to about 2.0-2.5 in (50–65 mm) snout-to-vent length, plus a tail of 3–4 in (75–100 mm). They are typically grey or tan in color, with black blotching. The males usually have blue patches on either side of their bellies, whereas the females do not. Females often change to have bright orange patches when gravid.

Behavior
Holbrookia species are diurnal, basking lizards. They spend the vast majority of their time sunning on rocks, even in the heat of the day, until the surface temperature reaches around 104 °F (40 °C), when they will retreat to a rock crevice or burrow.

Diet
Lesser earless lizards are insectivorous.

Species
The genus Holbrookia contains six species recognized as valid:.
Holbrookia approximans  – speckled earless lizard
Holbrookia elegans  – elegant earless lizard
Holbrookia lacerata  – northern spot-tailed earless lizard
Holbrookia maculata  – lesser earless lizard
Holbrookia propinqua  – keeled earless lizard
Holbrookia subcaudalis  – southern spot-tailed earless lizard

Geographic range
Earless lizards (genera Cophosaurus and Holbrookia) are found in the Southwestern and Central United States, in Texas, Arizona, New Mexico, Utah, Colorado, Kansas, Oklahoma, and as far north as Nebraska, South Dakota, and Wyoming. They are also found in Mexico, in the states of Sonora, Chihuahua, Coahuila, Sinaloa, Durango, Zacatecas, San Luis Potosí, Nuevo León, Tamaulipas, and Veracruz.

See also
Genus Cophosaurus, the greater earless lizard

References

External links

Colorado Herpetological Society: Lesser earless lizard

Further reading
Girard C (1851). "On a New American Saurian Reptile". Proc. American Assoc. Adv. Sci., New Haven 4: 200–202. (Holbrookia, new genus, pp. 200–201; H. maculata, new species, pp. 201–202).

 
Lizard genera
Lizards of North America
Reptiles of Mexico
Reptiles of the United States
Taxa named by Charles Frédéric Girard
Taxa named by John Edwards Holbrook